Freistatt is a village in Lawrence County, Missouri, United States. The population was 163 at the 2010 census.

History
Freistatt was laid out in 1873. The community was named by German settlers after the town of Freistatt in Lower Saxony, Germany. The settlers established Trinity Lutheran Church in 1874 and opened a Lutheran school in 1875, both of which remain important institutions in the village. The Freistatt post office has been in operation since 1884.

Geography
Freistatt is located at  (37.021322, -93.896449).

Demographics

2010 census
As of the census of 2010, there were 163 people, 81 households, and 44 families living in the village. The racial makeup of the village was 89.6% White, 4.3% Native American, 0.6% Asian, 4.9% from other races, and 0.6% from two or more races. Hispanic or Latino of any race were 9.8% of the population.

There were 81 households, of which 24.7% had children under the age of 18 living with them, 40.7% were married couples living together, 9.9% had a female householder with no husband present, 3.7% had a male householder with no wife present, and 45.7% were non-families. 44.4% of all households were made up of individuals, and 28.3% had someone living alone who was 65 years of age or older. The average household size was 2.01 and the average family size was 2.80.

The median age in the village was 46.1 years. 20.9% of residents were under the age of 18; 4.2% were between the ages of 18 and 24; 22.1% were from 25 to 44; 26.4% were from 45 to 64; and 26.4% were 65 years of age or older. The gender makeup of the village was 50.9% male and 49.1% female.

2000 census
At the 2000 census, there were 184 people, 79 households, and 50 families living in the village. The population density was 1,007.6 per square mile (394.7/km). There were 86 housing units at an average density of 470.9 per square mile (184.5/km). The racial makeup of the village was 90.76% White, 1.63% Native American, 2.72% from other races, and 4.89% from two or more races. Hispanic or Latino of any race were 3.80% of the population.

Of the 79 households, 29.1% had children under the age of 18 living with them, 51.9% were married couples living together, 7.6% had a female householder with no husband present, and 36.7% were non-families. 34.2% of all households were individuals, and 26.6% had someone living alone who was 65 years of age or older. The average household size was 2.33 and the average family size was 3.02.

In the village, the population was 28.3% under the age of 18, 6.5% from 18 to 24, 27.7% from 25 to 44, 13.6% from 45 to 64, and 23.9% who were 65 years of age or older. The median age was 36 years. For every 100 females, there were 82.2 males. For every 100 females age 18 and over, there were 80.8 males.

The median income for a household in the village was $21,750, and the median income for a family was $35,938. Males had a median income of $25,357 versus $19,375 for females. The per capita income for the village was $10,757. About 16.3% of families and 18.1% of the population were below the poverty line, including 30.6% of those under the age of eighteen and 14.0% of those 65 or over.

Climate
Climate is characterized by relatively high temperatures and evenly distributed precipitation throughout the year.  The Köppen Climate Classification subtype for this climate is "Cfa" (Humid Subtropical Climate).

References

Villages in Lawrence County, Missouri
Villages in Missouri